KBTG-LP (99.5 FM) was a radio station licensed to Buffalo, Wyoming, United States. The station was owned by Buffalo Baptist Church. Citing staffing issues, the station fell silent on May 4, 2014.

The Federal Communications Commission deleted KBTG-LP's call sign on October 29, 2015, due to the station having been silent for more than twelve months; the station's license was deemed to have expired on May 5, 2015, and has not been reinstated.

References

External links
 

BTG-LP
BTG-LP
Radio stations established in 2002
2002 establishments in Wyoming
Defunct radio stations in the United States
Radio stations disestablished in 2015
Defunct religious radio stations in the United States
2015 disestablishments in Wyoming
BTG-LP